The Huntingdon is a 503 ft (153m) tall skyscraper in Houston, Texas. The 34-floor structure was completed in 1984 by the developer James E. Lyon. It is the 27th tallest building in the city. It is also the tallest entirely residential building in Houston and was the tallest residential building in Texas until the Mercantile Building was converted into residences. The Mercantile, with baroque gate piers, is twenty feet taller than The Huntingdon.

Zoned schools
The Huntington is within the Houston Independent School District.

Residents are zoned to River Oaks Elementary School, Lanier Middle School, and Lamar High School.

Notable residents
 Ken Lay
 William J. Hill
 Joanne King Herring

See also

List of tallest buildings in Houston

References

External links
The Huntington
Emporis
Skyscraperpage

Residential skyscrapers in Houston
Buildings and structures completed in 1984